Acanthonevroides basalis is a species of tephritid or fruit flies in the genus Acanthonevroides of the family Tephritidae.

References

Phytalmiinae